Dickinson Valley is a valley,  long, on the west side of Nickell Peak in the Cruzen Range of Victoria Land.
Named by the New Zealand Geographic Board in 2005 after Warren Dickinson, a geologist studying quaternary geology, who led Victoria University's Antarctic Expeditions field parties working in the McMurdo Dry Valleys during five seasons from 1996.
Originally mis-named Dickenson in 2005, the spelling was corrected to Dickinson by the NZGB in 2006.

References

Reference bibliography 

 
 

Valleys of Victoria Land